is a 2016 Japanese computer-animated family adventure drama film directed by Kunihiko Yuyama and Motonori Sakakibara. It was released in Japan by Toho on August 6, 2016.

Plot
Rudolf is a domestic little black cat from the little town of Gifu (region of Chubu, the center of Japan) who never left his home, being cared for by the child Rie, his owner. When Rie's mother asks her to visit his grandmother to take her food, Rudolf follows Rie out of the house in the wish to know the world outside the home. But when Rudolf runs afoul of a fishmonger, running away and gets inside a trailer of a truck, he's knocked out cold by a broom the fishmonger threw. When Rudolf wakes up and gets out from the trailer to explore, he meets "Gottalot", a big bobtailed street cat who lets Rudolf sleep under a temple. The next morning, Gottalot and Rudolf traverse the town, as Rudolf learns that Gottalot was given a lot of names by the people he encountered, but when he asks Gottalot if he was a pet cat, he leaves in a huff. Soon after, Rudolf encounters another cat by the name of Buchi with a habit of imitating martial arts moves and yelling "Hyah", who tells Rudolf that Gottalot was known as the Junk Tiger. He also tells Rudolf about a dangerous dog by the name of Devil. As Buchi offers to let Rudolf hang around his house, he explains Gottalot's fight against a Doberman, who threatens to tear his ear off if he returns. Buchi cuts the story short when he sees a beautiful Siamese cat and goes after her, but says goodbye to Rudolf.

Returning to the temple, Gottalot after learning that Buchi told Rudolf about his past, Gottalot explains that next to Devil's house is where his owner used to live until he went to the United States, leaving him. but taught him one thing, the ability to read. After Gottalot and Rudolf encounter Devil, Gottalot explained that since he became a stray, Devil looked down on him. After meeting up with Buchi, Gottalot and Rudolf infiltrate the school and enter a classroom, where Rudolf and Buchi become intrigued with the books, encouraging Rudolf to learn to read as Gottalot says that Rudolf will also need to learn how to write. the days went by as Rudolf learned to read, write and understand the Japanese characters. one day, when one of the teachers is watching TV, Rudolf sees his hometown, which is Gifu, which is known for the cable cars and castles. despite knowing that Gifu is over a hundred miles away, Rudolf decides to find a way to get home, by going into a truck heading for Gifu, but what he entered was a freezer truck. Gottalot and Buchi chase after the truck and retrieve Rudolf (frozen in a small block of ice) and free him. but Gottalot berates Rudolf for almost freezing to death.

Autumn came, and when a poster about a tour bus to Gifu, Rudolf and Gottalot ask Buchi, who becomes enticed to a Scottish Fold Cat named Misha who tells them that the bus will come at November 10 on 6:30 AM. Later in the day, Gottalot was injured by Devil. So, Rudolf tells Buchi to watch over Gottalot as he alerts the schoolteacher and leads him to Gottalot, the teacher says that Gottalot is still alive as he brings the injured cat to a doctor for medical attention. Buchi explains to Rudolf how Gottalot got hurt. the schoolteacher then tells the cats that Gottalot will stay with him as he'll need to rest for 2 weeks. In the Schoolteacher's house, Gottalot apologizes for making Rudolf worry, as Rudolf thanks him for watching over him as he says goodbye. Rudolf then faces Devil in a fight and despite Devil having the home advantage, Rudolf (with Buchi's fake out) beats Devil. But since Devil can't swim, he asks for help. Rudolf and Buchi then make him swear that he won't bully any cat ever again, to which Devil agrees to. Rudolf returns to Gottalot, who says that the tour bus left, so he won't be going back to Gifu. as the month's pass, Gottalot is fully recovered but isn't coming outside much. At spring, Buchi and Misha are dating, and Devil calmed down after their fight and explained that before Gottalot's owner moved away, Gottalot and Devil were good friends, but they broke off when Gottalot became a stray. Devil then has Rudolf give his food to Gottalot as a token of his apology. Later, Gottalot then helps Rudolf learn about the license plates of cars, signifying where they come from, along with Chinese text. One night, Gottalot explains that he'll be going to the United States, shocking everyone, since Gottalot's owner isn't going to return to his house as it is being remodeled.

The next day, Rudolf says goodbye to Gottalot, Buchi, and Misha as the Truck he is currently aboard goes to different prefectures, by going from one truck to the next. but despite one of the trucks getting a flat tire, he manages to get home, but, when he enters the house, to his surprise, he discovers another black kitten who happens to be Rudolf's younger brother, who lived in the house a year after Rudolf was gone. knowing that the family can't have more than one cat, Rudolf leaves and returns to Tokyo. upon returning to Tokyo, Rudolf sees Buchi and Misha and says that he decided to stay in Tokyo. Then he sees Gottalot, who said that he was going, but his former owner returned who made a lot of money in America after selling his business. Later at night, Gottalot, Buchi, Misha, and Rudolf (who is renamed Crow) along with a few stray cats eat dinner. They also learn that Devil can swim. As the other cats enjoy themselves, Gottalot and Crow look at the night sky looking forward to the future.

Cast
Mao Inoue as Rudolf
Ryohei Suzuki as Gottalot
Akio Ōtsuka as Master Kuma
Arata Furuta as Devil
Norito Yashima as Buchi
Nana Mizuki as Misha
Rio Sasaki as Rie
Sandayū Dokumamushi as  Truck Driver
Yuka Terasaki as Rudolf's younger brother

Reception
By its second weekend it had grossed  and by its third weekend, .

References

External links
  

2010s Japanese films
2010s adventure drama films
2016 anime films
2016 computer-animated films
Animated adventure films
Animated drama films
Animated films about friendship
Animated films about cats
Adventure anime and manga
2010s children's adventure films
2010s children's animated films
Children's drama films
Drama anime and manga
Films directed by Kunihiko Yuyama
Nippon TV films
Japanese adventure drama films
Toho animated films
2016 drama films
OLM, Inc. animated films
2010s Japanese-language films